Sizo or SIZO may refer to
Abbreviation for a detention center (СИЗО, следственный изолятор) in countries of the former Soviet Union
Sizo Maseko (born 1991), South African rugby union player